The 2001 World Snooker Championship (also referred to as the 2001 Embassy World Snooker Championship for the purposes of sponsorship) was a professional ranking snooker tournament that took place between 21 April and 7 May 2001 at the Crucible Theatre in Sheffield, England. The tournament was sponsored by cigarette manufacturer Embassy.

Defending champion Mark Williams lost in the second round 12–13 against Joe Swail, and became the latest first-time champion to fall to the Crucible curse, being unable to defend his first World title.

Ronnie O'Sullivan won his first World title by defeating John Higgins 18–14 in the final.

Tournament summary
 Both Steve Davis and Jimmy White failed to qualify for the championship for the first time since their World Championship debuts, in 1979 and 1981 respectively. They were both eliminated in the final qualifying round; Davis lost 6–10 against Andy Hicks and White lost 7–10 against Michael Judge.
 Patrick Wallace reached the quarter-finals of the championship on his debut, however he never qualified for the main draw again.

Prize fund
The breakdown of prize money for this year is shown below:

 Winner: £250,000
 Runner-up: £147,000
 Semi-final: £73,000
 Quarter-final: £36,500
 Last 16: £20,000
 Last 32: £14,000
 Last 48: £10,500
 Last 64: £6,600
 Last 96: £4,000
 Last 128: £1,100
 Highest break: £20,000
 Maximum break: £147,000
 Total: £1,532,000

Main draw
Shown below are the results for each round. The numbers in parentheses beside some of the players are their seeding ranks (each championship has 16 seeds and 16 qualifiers).

Qualifying 

The qualifying matches were held between 20 February and 4 March 2001 at the Newport Centre in Newport, Wales.

Round 1

Round 2–4

Round 5–6

Century breaks 
There were 53 century breaks in the Championship. The highest break of the tournament was 140 made by Joe Swail.
 

 140, 138, 114, 107  Joe Swail
 139, 139, 136, 135, 126, 121, 113, 110, 107, 105, 103  John Higgins
 139, 134, 133, 126, 100, 100  Matthew Stevens
 139, 133, 119, 114, 108, 108, 106, 100, 100  Ronnie O'Sullivan
 137  Mark King
 135, 125, 104  Patrick Wallace
 130, 108, 100  Paul Hunter
 129, 106, 100  Stephen Hendry

 121, 100  Stephen Lee
 116, 114, 101  Ken Doherty
 114, 110  Anthony Hamilton
 110, 101  Peter Ebdon
 108  Michael Judge
 102  Nick Dyson
 101  Chris Small
 101  Mark Williams

References

2001
World Championship
World Snooker Championship
Sports competitions in Sheffield
April 2001 sports events in the United Kingdom
May 2001 sports events in the United Kingdom